Mateusz Kuzimski (born 26 June 1991) is a Polish professional footballer who plays as a forward for Radunia Stężyca.

Born in Tczew, Kuzimski began his career with Unia Tczew, but suffered a knee injury in his early 20s. After moving to England to work in a food packing warehouse, he attended a trial for uncontracted players, and after a second trial signed for Cambridge City F.C., before moving to Histon F.C. He played 30 times for Histon, scoring four goals, before returning to Poland with Bałtyk Gdynia.

Kuzimski then signed for Chojniczanka Chojnice, finishing second-top scorer in the 2019–20 I liga.

In the summer of 2020 he signed for Ekstraklasa side Warta Poznań. 

On 25 February 2022, he joined I liga club Arka Gdynia on a year-and-a-half deal. He left the club by mutual consent on 3 January 2023.

On 25 January of that year, he signed with II liga side Radunia Stężyca.

References

Living people
1991 births
Association football forwards
Polish footballers
Miedź Legnica players
Cambridge City F.C. players
Histon F.C. players
Bałtyk Gdynia players
Gryf Wejherowo players
Bytovia Bytów players
Chojniczanka Chojnice players
Warta Poznań players
Arka Gdynia players
Ekstraklasa players
I liga players
II liga players
III liga players
Polish expatriate footballers
Polish expatriate sportspeople in England
Expatriate footballers in England